This is a list of transfers in Dutch football for the 2011 Winter transfer window. Only moves featuring an Eredivisie side and/or an Eerste Divisie side are listed.

The winter transfer window will open on January 1, 2011, and will close on January 31. Deals may be signed at any given moment in the season, but the actual transfer may only take place during the transfer window. Unattached players may sign at any moment.

Notes
 Transfer will take place on 1 January 2012.

References

Football transfers winter 2011-12
2011-12
Dutch

vi:Danh sách chuyển nhượng bóng đá Hà Lan hè 2011